"Iname" is a song by Scottish band Biffy Clyro and their debut single released on 28 June 1999, by Aereogramme's, independent, Babi Yaga record label. This first release led to the band being chosen by Stow College's Electric Honey record label to release a record, thekidswhopoptodaywillrocktomorrow.

Track listings
Songs and lyrics by Simon Neil. Music by Biffy Clyro.
CD
"Iname" – 3:07
"All The Way Down (Chapter 2)"– 3:16
"Travis Perkins" – 2:24

Personnel
 Simon Neil – guitar, vocals
 James Johnston – bass, vocals
 Ben Johnston – drums, vocals

Notes

External links

1999 debut singles
Biffy Clyro songs
Songs written by Simon Neil
1999 songs